Mount Johnston (Chinese: 玉桂山), also known as Yuk Kwai Shan, is a hill located on the island of Ap Lei Chau in Hong Kong. The hill is 196m in height and is a popular site for hiking.

History 
This hill is named after Alexander Robert Johnston (14 June 1812 – 21 January 1888), a British colonial official who served twice as Acting Administrator of Hong Kong from 1841 to 1842.

Fake Yuk Kwai Shan 
A nearby summit lower than Mount Johnston's (i.e. Yuk Kwai Shan) main peak houses leisure facilities by the government and is called Fake Yuk Kwai Shan by the local hiking community.

Hiking 
The steep incline of this hill means that parts of trail leading to its summit from the south side require the use of a rope installed on the mountain.

Road access 
There is no road access up the hill.

See also 
 List of mountains, peaks and hills in Hong Kong

References 

Ap Lei Chau